A waste container, also known as a dustbin, garbage can, and trash can is a type of container that is usually made out of metal or plastic. The words "rubbish", "basket" and "bin" are more common in British English usage; "trash" and "can" are more common in American English usage. "Garbage" may refer to food waste specifically (when distinguished from "trash") or to municipal solid waste in general.

Designs

A pedal bin is a container with a lid operated by a foot pedal. Lillian Moller Gilbreth, an industrial engineer and efficiency expert, invented the pedal bin in the 1920s for the disposal of kitchen waste. The foot pedal enables the user to open the lid without touching it with their hands.

In the 2010s, some bins have begun to include automated mechanisms such as a lid with infrared detection on the top of the can powered by batteries to open it rather than a foot pedal, freeing the user from touching the bin in any way. This helps prevent the bin lids becoming clogged with trash. These wastes containers are mostly made of stainless steel. Some bin models also include a small receptable for an air freshener.

Origins

French
Legislation surrounding waste receptacles was first introduced in France in an 1883 prefectural order signed by Eugène Poubelle, from whose name the French word for a waste receptacle comes. This order mandated the provision and collection of waste bins to each household in Paris. These bins were specified as having to be between 80 and 120 litres in volume and having a handle and a lid. Three waste bins were to be allocated to each household in order to sort refuse from reclaimable fibres such as paper and cloth and other reusable materials like ceramics, glasses and oyster shells.

English
Legislation setting out the responsibilities for the provision and collection of "receptacles for the temporary deposit and collection of dust ashes and rubbish" by local authorities in Britain was first set out in the Public Health Act 1875. However, this did not mandate the use of them, leaving the decision to offer the service to local government instead.

Household collection

In many cities and towns, there is a public waste collection service which regularly collects household waste from outside buildings. The waste is loaded into a garbage truck and driven to a landfill, incinerator or crush facility to be disposed of.

In some areas, each household has multiple bins for different categories of rubbish (usually represented by colours) depending on its suitability for recycling, which will instead be routed to a recycling center.

Roadside waste collection is often done by means of larger metal containers of varying designs, mostly called dumpsters in the US, and skips in the UK.

Public collection

Public areas such as parks, often have litter bins placed to improve the social environment by encouraging people not to litter. Such bins in outdoor locations or other busy public areas are usually mounted to the ground or wall to discourage theft, and reduce vandalism, and to improve their appearance are sometimes deliberately artistic or cute. In dense urban areas, trash is stored underground below the receptacle. Many are lined with a plastic or paper bin bag to help contain liquids.

Metaphors
The term "garbage can" is also used for a model of decision making, the "Garbage Can Model" of decision making. It is concerned with cases of decision making in great aggregate uncertainty which can cause decisions to arise that from a distant point of view might seem irrational.

A "trash can" metaphor is often used in computer operating system desktop environments as a place files can be moved for deletion.

In a workplace setting, a bin may be euphemistically called "the circular file", "the round file" or "the janitor's file". Whereas useful documents are filed in a filing cabinet, which is rectangular, junk mail and other worthless items are "filed" in the bin, which is often round.

The term "wastebasket" is occasionally used in taxonomy to refer to less formal (and often paraphyletic) groupings that pose problems in classification (e.g., the proposed order Insectivora is considered a "wastebasket taxon", as it groups small mammals that do not fit nicely into other taxa), and the Nilo-Saharan language family is sometimes called "Greenberg's wastebasket", as it was a grouping made by him to fit the languages of Africa that did not fall into the other groups, Afroasiatic, Niger–Congo and Khoisan.

Examples

See also
 Bin bug
 Clever Bins
 Compost
 Pot farming
 Push the Talking Trash Can
 Recycling bin
 Roll-off (dumpster)
 Waste management
 Oscar the Grouch

References

External links

 Example of Waste Design for Recycling in Public Spaces

Recycling
Street furniture
Waste containers